The 2022–23 season is the 122nd season in the existence of Barrow Association Football Club and the club's third consecutive season in League Two. In addition to the league, they will also compete in the 2022–23 FA Cup, the 2022–23 EFL Cup and the 2022–23 EFL Trophy.

Squad statistics

Transfers

In

Out

Loans in

Loans out

Pre-season and friendlies
On May 26, Barrow announced their first pre-season fixture, against South Shields. Four days later, a trip to Witton Albion was added to the schedule. A third away friendly fixture, against Holker Old Boys was also confirmed. Shortly followed by a fourth, against Ashton United. On June 9, a home pre-season fixture against Fleetwood Town was confirmed. A second home pre-season match against fellow League Two side Salford City was later added to the calendar. The finalised schedule was announced with the addition of Penrith.

Competitions

Overall record

League Two

League table

Results summary

Results by round

Matches

On 23 June, the league fixtures were announced.

FA Cup

Barrow were drawn at home to Mansfield Town in the first round.

EFL Cup

EFL Trophy

On 20 June, the initial Group stage draw was made, grouping Barrow with Carlisle United and Fleetwood Town. In the second round, Barrow were drawn away to Bolton Wanderers.

Notes

References

Barrow
Barrow A.F.C. seasons